|}

The Prix La Haye Jousselin is a Group 1 steeplechase in France which is open to horses aged five years or older. It is run at Auteuil over a distance of 5,500 metres (about 3 miles and 3½ furlongs), and it is scheduled to take place each year in November.

The race usually features horses which also compete in the Grand Steeple-Chase de Paris, the most prestigious steeplechase in France. There are twenty-two obstacles to be jumped, and the most notorious of these is the Rail-Ditch and Fence (the Juge de Paix).

History
The event was established in 1880, and it was originally called the Prix de la Croix de Berny. It was initially contested over 6,000 metres, and it was cut to 5,600 metres in 1893. It was given its present title in 1903, and at the same time it was shortened by 100 metres.

Its new title was in memory of Edmond de La Haye Jousselin (1839–1903), a founding member of the Société des Steeple-Chases de France. As a steward and administrator of this organisation, La Haye Jousselin assisted with the design of Auteuil's racetracks, and he oversaw the construction of its obstacles. He later became the vice-chairman, a position he occupied until his death.

The Prix La Haye Jousselin was abandoned throughout World War I, with no running from 1914 to 1918. It was cancelled once during World War II, in 1939. It was cut to 4,500 metres in 1940, and it was restored to 5,500 metres in 1941.

Notable winners of the Prix La Haye Jousselin include The Fellow, a subsequent winner of the Cheltenham Gold Cup, and Al Capone II, a repeat winner in the 1990s. The latter achieved the extraordinary feat of winning the race seven times in successive years from 1993 to 1999. Many winners have also achieved victory in the Grand Steeple-Chase de Paris, which is held at the same venue in late May. The most recent of these is Remember Rose, the winner of the latter event in 2009.

Records
Leading jockey (8 wins):
 Jean-Yves Beaurain – Katko (1989), Al Capone II (1993, 1994, 1995, 1996, 1997, 1998, 1999)

Leading trainer (9 wins):
 Bernard Sécly – Katko (1989), Al Capone II (1993, 1994, 1995, 1996, 1997, 1998, 1999), El Paso III (2001)

Leading owner (8 wins):
 Robert Fougedoire – Al Capone II (1993, 1994, 1995, 1996, 1997, 1998, 1999), El Paso III (2001)

Winners since 1980

Earlier winners

 1880 - Basque
 1881 - Basque
 1882 - Vatan
 1883 - Tant Mieux
 1884 - Entraineur
 1885 - Baudres
 1886 - Rostrenen
 1887 - La Vigne
 1888 - Montgeroult
 1889 - Bandmaster
 1890 - no race
 1891 - Silversmith
 1892 - Mondeville
 1893 - Le Rakos
 1894 - Olifant
 1895 - Turco
 1896 - Solitaire
 1897 - Marise
 1898 - Prefet
 1899 - Bucheron
 1900 - Maragon
 1901 - Killarney
 1902 - Killarney
 1903 - Bebe
 1904 - Violon II
 1905 - Dandolo
 1906 - Cintra
 1907 - Royal Visiteur
 1908 - Pharaon
 1909 - Sauveur
 1910 - Sauveur
 1911 - Trudon
 1912 - Magicienne
 1913 - Montagnard
 1914–18 - no race
 1919 - Cesar Auguste
 1920 - Heros XII
 1921 - Heros XII
 1922 - L'Yser
 1923 - Onyx II
 1924 - Gorey
 1925 - Vitrail
 1926 - The Coyote
 1927 - Maguelonne
 1928 - Rhyticere
 1929 - Heugon
 1930 - La Granja
 1931 - Millionnaire II
 1932 - Andromaque II
 1933 - Yarlas
 1934 - Fleuret
 1935 - Manteau de Savoie
 1936 - Storm
 1937 - Bao Dai
 1938 - Siklos
 1939 - no race
 1940 - Jalgreya
 1941 - Frere Victor
 1942 - Merigo
 1943 - Le Chevreuil
 1944 - Merigo
 1945 - Symbole
 1946 - Fabiano
 1947 - Meli Melo
 1948 - Rideo
 1949 - Meli Melo
 1950 - Meli Melo
 1951 - Rameau
 1952 - Fifrelet
 1953 - Diamant de Bourgogne
 1954 - Le Phare
 1955 - Quo Vadis
 1956 - Hunorisk
 1957 - Aredien
 1958 - Meslay
 1959 - Illuminee
 1960 - Pirate IV
 1961 - Azzemour II
 1962 - Silfol
 1963 - Liberty's
 1964 - Caid II
 1965 - Cresus
 1966 - Weather Permitting
 1967 - Meristria
 1968 - Haroue
 1969 - Huron
 1970 - Ravageur
 1971 - Samour
 1972 - Jouventur
 1973 - Klavier
 1974 - Kashtan
 1975 - Frederik
 1976 - Tofano
 1977 - Dom Helion
 1978 - Great Mist
 1979 - Sambristan

See also
 List of French jump horse races
 Repeat winners of horse races
 Recurring events established in 1880  – this race is included under its original title, Prix de la Croix de Berny.

References
 France Galop / Racing Post:
 galop.courses-france.com:
 1880–1889, 1890–1919, 1920–1949, 1950–1979, 1980–present

 france-galop.com – A Brief History: Prix La Haye Jousselin.
 pedigreequery.com – Prix La Haye Jousselin – Auteuil.

Horse races in France
Steeplechase (horse racing)